The Matthew and Johanna Rowan House, at 198 W. Winchester St. in Murray, Utah, was listed on the National Register of Historic Places in 2019.

It is a one-and-a-half-story central-block-with-projecting bays-type house built in 1887.  It has Victorian Eclectic styling.

References

Houses completed in 1887
National Register of Historic Places in Salt Lake County, Utah
Buildings and structures in Murray, Utah
Houses on the National Register of Historic Places in Utah